The Society of Classical Poets is a nonprofit organization that is dedicated to reviving traditional poetry. It typically publishes, online and in its annual journal, a variety of poetry that uses rhyme and meter.

History 
The Society was established in 2012 by Evan Mantyk, an English teacher, and Joshua Philipp, a journalist. It runs several poetry contests, including a "Friends of Falun Gong Poetry Contest", yearly since 2016.

Public Promotion of Classical Poetry
Beginning in 2019, in addition to the daily posting of formal poetry on its web site, the Society of Classical Poets has held public events for the promotion of traditional poetry with meter and rhyme.

On June 17, 2019, the Society of Classical Poets held a Symposium at the Princeton Club in Manhattan, where Society president Evan Mantyk said, “We say that rhyme and meter are the key to bringing poetry out of the narrow halls of academia and making it a widely loved art form once again.” 

In 2020, the Society’s online symposium featured A.M. Juster, a major formalist poet  as well as the former Social Security Administration Commissioner under the Obama and Bush administrations.

Controversy
In January 2017, the Society released a poem titled Pibroch for the Domhnall, that was widely circulated by various media outlets as the official inaugural poem for the inauguration of President Donald J. Trump, but the poem was not in fact read at the inauguration. The poem described departing president Barack Obama and a review in the Literary Review of Canada said that "One stanza invokes immigration policy: “Lest a murderous horde, for whom hell is the norm,/ Should threaten our lives and our nation deform”; another attacks women and Hillary Clinton, if not by name: “Whilst hapless old harridans flapping their traps/ Teach women to look and behave like us chaps.” Bereft of image, lacking metaphor, strained for diction, and funny without wanting to be, the poem is a fitting tribute to a terrible president." Another review in the Los Angeles Review of Books said that it linked "into the same rhetoric that demonized Abraham Lincoln and the Reconstruction governments that attempted to implement racial equality after the Civil War..." and that "the pseudo-medievalism of the “Pibroch for the Domhnall” thus generates a fantasy of white ethnic nationalism...".

References

External links 
 Society of Classical Poets's website

Non-profit organizations based in New York (state)
Poetry organizations